The William Starr Miller House is a mansion at 1048 Fifth Avenue, on the Upper East Side of Manhattan in New York City. Prior to Miller’s development of the property, the site was home to David Mayer (died in 1914), a founder of the David Mayer Brewing Company and a friend of Oscar S. Straus.

History 
It was originally constructed for the industrialist William Starr Miller. Miller hired the renowned New York-based, Beaux-Arts architectural firm Carrere and Hastings to design a six-story Louis XIII style townhouse for himself and his family, to be located in Manhattan at 1048 Fifth Avenue (on the southeast corner at East 86th Street). The work was completed in 1914.

Miller's daughter Edith Starr Miller married the widowed Lord Queenborough in July 1921, in the music room. Miller died at the house in 1935 and his widow continued to live there until her death in 1944.

After Mrs. Miller's death, the townhouse was occupied by Grace Vanderbilt (1870–1953), wife of Cornelius Vanderbilt III (1873–1942), and then by the YIVO Institute for Jewish Research. Purchased in 1994 by art dealer and museum exhibition organizer Serge Sabarsky (1912–1996) and cosmetics billionaire Ronald S. Lauder (born 1944), the building was fully renovated by German architect Annabelle Selldorf and restored to its original state. It contains the Neue Galerie New York, which opened on November 16, 2001.

References

Further reading 

 
 Ossman, Laurie; Ewing, Heather (2011). Carrère and Hastings, The Masterworks. Rizzoli USA. 

Carrère and Hastings buildings
Fifth Avenue
Houses in Manhattan
Upper East Side